K. Sanbagamaran (born 19 February 1972) is a former Malaysian professional footballer.

He played for Selangor FA, Sabah FA and PKNS FC during his career. He also played for the national team, and played a major role in Malaysia reaching the final of 1996 Tiger Cup, where he scored 6 goals during the tournament, one less than top scorer of the tournament Netipong Srithong-in.

On 21 February 1997, He scored 2 goal which ended in a 2–1 Won against Finland in the 1997 Dunhill Cup Malaysia.

On 17 September 2014, FourFourTwo list him on their list of the top 25 Malaysian footballers of all time.

Honours

Player
Selangor
Malaysia Premier 1: 2000
Malaysia FA Cup: 1997, 2005
Malaysia Cup: 1997
Malaysia Charity Shield: 1997

References

External links
 

1972 births
Living people
Malaysian footballers
Malaysia international footballers
Sabah F.C. (Malaysia) players
PKNS F.C. players
Selangor FA players
People from Selangor
Malaysian people of Tamil descent
Malaysian sportspeople of Indian descent
Malaysia Super League players
Association football defenders
Association football midfielders
Footballers at the 1994 Asian Games
Asian Games competitors for Malaysia